Melis Sezen  (born 2 January 1997) is a Turkish actress.

Sezen made her television debut with the youth series Hayat Bazen Tatlıdır and was later cast in Siyah İnci. She had her first leading role in Leke, after which she appeared in a main role in Sevgili Geçmiş. Aside from her television career, Sezen has appeared in a number movies. Her first major cinematic experience came in 2018 with a role in Bizim İçin Şampiyon. In the same year she appeared in the movies Tilki Yuvası and Dünya Hali. In 2019, she landed a role in Mahsun Kırmızıgül's movie Mucize 2: Aşk. Her most recent TV work was in TRT 1's series Ya İstiklal Ya Ölüm, in which she portrayed "Nazan". In September 2020, she was cast in a leading role in Sadakatsiz.

Life and career

Sezen was born on 2 January 1997 in Silivri, Istanbul, and completed her high school education at Selimpaşa Atatürk Anatolian High School. Her paternal family members are Albanian-Macedonian immigrants, while her maternal family members are Turkish descent who immigrated from Thessaloniki, Greece. Sezen has a younger brother and her family engages in trade. In an interview, she mentioned that her family was supportive of her decision to start working as a theatre actress, and in another interview she adds that it was her mother who discovered her interest in acting and enrolled her in Müjdat Gezen Art Center. Sezen received drama education from the age of 12, and received theater education for one year in Müjdat Gezen Art Center. Then she acquired a role in the play Cümbüş-ü Hospital at Ali Solmaz Theatre in Silivri. Meanwhile, she continued her education and graduated from Koç University, Department of Media and Visual Arts. Between 2016-17, she made her TV debut with a role in the series Hayat Bazen Tatlıdır.

Between 2017-18, she played the role of "Ebru" in the TV series Siyah İnci. In 2018, she made her cinematic film with a number of independent films. She first starred in the movie Dünya Hali, followed by Tilki Yuvası. After these movies, she had her first serious cinematic role in Bizim İçin Şampiyon, which tells the story of racehorse Bold Pilot and jokey Halis Karataş. In 2019, she had a leading role in the TV series Leke, playing the role of "Yasemin". This was followed by another leading role in Sevgili Geçmiş, in which she portrayed the character "Deren". Also in 2019, she landed a role in the movie Mucize 2: Aşk and played the role of "Beren". In the same year, Sezen also ranked among the first 100 names on IMDb's Starmetre list.

In 2020, she played the leading character "Nazan" in the historical mini series Ya İstiklal Ya Ölüm, which covers the occupation of Constantinople, the dissolution of the Chamber of Deputies, the Kuva-yi Milliye movement led by Mustafa Kemal Atatürk and the establishment processes of a new national assembly in Ankara. She also had a role in the movie Kovala, which was initially set to be released on 17 April 2020, but following the new measures enforced as a result of the COVID-19 pandemic the premiere date was pushed to a later date. Since October 2020, she has been sharing the leading role with Cansu Dere and Caner Cindoruk in the Kanal D series Sadakatsiz, a local adaptation of Doctor Foster.

Personal life
In 2020, it was rumoured that Melis dated Turkish singer Murat Dalkılıç, who had previously dated actress Hande Erçel, however both of them revealed through their Instagram that they aren't dating.

Filmography

References

External links 
 

1997 births
Actresses from Istanbul
21st-century Turkish actresses
Turkish television actresses
Turkish film actresses
Koç University alumni
Living people
Turkish people of Albanian descent
Turkish people of Macedonian descent

https://t.me/melissezenfc